Edamalayar or Idamalayar is one of the major tributaries of the Periyar river, the longest river in Kerala state south India. Idamalayar Dam is situated in this river. It originates in the Anamalais of Kerala's Ernakulam district, and flows into Tamil Nadu. It re-enters Kerala near Malakkappara, and flows into the Idamalayar Dam. It joins the Periyar near Kuttampuzha.

See also
 Periyar River - Main river

Other major tributaries of Periyar river
Muthirapuzha River
Mullayar 
Cheruthoni 
Perinjankutti

Rivers of Ernakulam district
Periyar (river)